Watkins Ferry Toll House was an historic toll house located at Martinsburg, Berkeley County, West Virginia. It was built in 1837, and was a small rectangular stone building, measuring approximately 17 feet wide by 23 feet deep.  It had a gable roof and featured Greek Revival-style architectural details. While being used as a private dwelling, it burned on February 8, 1985.  The remains of the foundation were finally removed in early 2004 to make room for a housing development.

It was listed on the National Register of Historic Places in 1980.

References

Transportation buildings and structures on the National Register of Historic Places in West Virginia
Greek Revival houses in West Virginia
Houses completed in 1837
Transport infrastructure completed in 1837
Buildings and structures in Martinsburg, West Virginia
National Register of Historic Places in Martinsburg, West Virginia
Toll houses on the National Register of Historic Places